Physomerus is a genus of Asian true bugs in the subfamily Coreinae, subfamily Coreinae, tribe Acanthocorini; containing the notable pest species Physomerus grossipes (Fabricius, 1794). The genus was erected by Hermann Burmeister in 1835.

Species
 Physomerus centralis Mukherjee, Hassan & Biswas, 2016
 Physomerus flavicans Blöte, 1935
 Physomerus grossipes (Fabricius, 1794) - type species (as Lygaeus grossipes Fabricius)
 Physomerus parvulus Dallas, 1852

References

http://coreoidea.speciesfile.org/Common/basic/Taxa.aspx?TaxonNameID=1187373
http://carabidae.org/carabidae/taxa/cordicollis-chaudoir-in-oberthur-1883.html?img=main&max_img_cnt=0

Acanthocorini
Coreidae genera